Gerard "Gerry" Brady (born 1948) is an Irish former Fianna Fáil politician and Teachta Dála (TD) for the Kildare constituency.

He was elected at the February 1982 general election to the 23rd Dáil, but at the November 1982 general election he lost his seat to Fine Gael's Bernard Durkan. He was defeated again at the 1987 general election, and did not stand for Dáil Éireann again. At the 1985 local elections he was elected to Kildare County Council as a councillor for Celbridge, and held his council seat at the 1991 local elections.

His wife Áine Brady (née Kitt) was a TD for Kildare North between the 2007 general election and the 2011 general election, and served as a Minister of State. Her brothers Tom Kitt and Michael P. Kitt have both been Fianna Fáil TDs and government ministers, as was her father Michael F. Kitt.

Brady and his wife were involved in the 2020 Oireachtas Golf Society scandal.

See also
Families in the Oireachtas

References

1948 births
Living people
Fianna Fáil TDs
Gerry
Local councillors in County Kildare
Members of the 23rd Dáil
Spouses of Irish politicians